Sarah Rebecca Robbins (born July 30, 1992) is a Canadian soccer player from Montreal, Quebec. She last played for Portland Thorns FC of the National Women's Soccer League.

Early life 
Robbins was born in Montreal, Quebec.

Robbins attended University of Kansas where she played as a midfielder for the Jayhawks. Robbins made 50 appearances for the Jayhawks in 2009–12, averaging 52.8 minutes over 50 matches with a goal and four assists.

Club career

Robins played with the Laval Comets of the USL W-League from 2009 to 2013, helping guide the club to the league championship match in 2013.

Robbins appeared in 14 matches, recording three goals and seven assists, for Finnish club Åland United in 2014. The midfielder logged 1,189 minutes for the Naisten Liiga side, and competed in the qualifying round of the 2014–15 UEFA Women's Champions League.

Robbins was signed by the Portland Thorns on February 26, 2015, as a free agent. She was waived on June 18, 2015, after only making one appearance for the team.

In the 2015–16 American off-season Robbins scored two goals in seven Cypriot First Division games with Apollon Limassol.

References

External links
 
 

1992 births
Living people
Anglophone Quebec people
Canadian expatriate women's soccer players
Canadian expatriate sportspeople in Finland
Canadian expatriate sportspeople in Cyprus
Canadian expatriate sportspeople in the United States
Canadian women's soccer players
Expatriate women's footballers in Finland
Expatriate women's footballers in Cyprus
Expatriate women's soccer players in the United States
Kansas Jayhawks women's soccer players
National Women's Soccer League players
Portland Thorns FC players
Soccer players from Montreal
USL W-League (1995–2015) players
University of Kansas alumni
Apollon Ladies F.C. players
Women's association football midfielders
Laval Comets players